Eugen Papst (24 December 1886 – 2 January 1956) was a German composer and music teacher.

Life 
Papst was born in Oberammergau the son of the pedagogue and head teacher of the same name, Eugen Papst (1855-1923), after whom the Eugen-Papst-Förderschule in Germering was later named. He then attended the teacher training seminar in Freising and studied at the University of Music and Performing Arts Munich from 1907.

In 1910 he worked at the theater in Olsztyn and from 1911 in Bern as musical director of the city theater. In 1922 he was called to Hamburg, where he conducted the Hamburg Philharmonic together with Karl Muck until it was disbanded by the Nazis in 1934. Papst first went to Münster as General Music Director in the fall of 1934, but by 1935 he had already become director of the Cologne Men's Choral Society and shortly afterwards, with the support of his friend Richard Strauss, also became municipal General Music Director of the Gürzenich Orchestra Cologne as successor to Hermann Abendroth. He also taught conducting at the Cologne Academy of Music. After the end of the war, there were disputes over his position as General Music Director because the City of Cologne appointed Günter Wand in 1946 despite an ongoing contract with Papst. In his opinion, Papst became more and more "the musical leading figure of the eternalists". Hoffmann und Campe, Hamburg 1998, .

Pope accepted an offer to the Hochschule für Musik Detmold, where he held master classes in conducting.

For the 1950 Oberammergau Passion Play, he created an arrangement of the Passion music by Rochus Dedler (1779-1822), which was played unchanged until 1990 and is still in use today with revisions and additions by the present musical director Markus Zwink.

His other works include orchestral works, choruses and Lieder, which have only been partially published.

Papst died in Bern at the age of 69.

Honours 
 In 1933, Pabst was awarded the Johannes Brahms Medal of Hambourg.

Bibliography 
 Letters von E. Papst from 1929 to 1934, C.F.Peters Verlag.

External links 
  Catalogue on the site of the Deutsche National Bibliothek

Sources 
biography by Monika Reger (Neue Deutsche Biographie)

References 

20th-century German composers
German male conductors (music)
20th-century German conductors (music)
20th-century German male musicians
1886 births
People from Upper Bavaria
1956 deaths